Collège Stanislas in Sainte-Foy and Collège Stanislas de Montréal (FR) Outremont, Quebec are two campuses of an exclusive French language private education institution for boys and girls aged 4 to 18 years which is accredited by the Agency for French Education Abroad (part of the Ministry of Education of France).

History
The school was founded in 1938 by Raoul Dandurand and other wealthy French Canadians as a Roman Catholic subsidiary of the renowned Collège Stanislas de Paris in Paris, France. Architect Jean Julien Perrault designed the campus on Dollard Boulevard in Outremont in 1941.  The second location in  Ste.-Foy opened in 1989.

Programs
The college offers the equivalent of a provincial Secondary School Graduation Diploma (DES), Diploma of Collegial Studies (DEC), and the French Baccalaureate. The college offers three pre-university programs. These pre-university programs, which take two years to complete, cover the subject matters which roughly correspond to the additional year of high school given elsewhere in Canada in preparation for a chosen field in university.

Campuses
 1605 chemin Ste-Foy, Québec City
 780 boulevard Dollard, Outremont

Notable alumni
 Jacques Parizeau, former Premier of Quebec
 Anthony Duclair, professional hockey player
 Raymond Bachand, Quebec Minister of Economic Development, Innovation and Export Trade
 Jerome Choquette, lawyer and politician
 André D'Allemagne, teacher, political commentator, essayist
 Sébastien Dhavernas, actor and politician
 Alain Dubuc, journalist and economist
 Charles Gonthier, former Justice of the Supreme Court of Canada
 Cleo Paskal, geopolitical analyst and author
 Michel Brault, filmmaker
 Claude Jutra, filmmaker
 Patrick Gemayel, member of Chromeo
 David Macklovitch, member of Chromeo
 :fr: Antoine de Vial, priest, poet and essayist also as Vim Karénine
 Jean-Louis Baudouin, lawyer and Officer of the Order of Canada
 Anaïs Barbeau-Lavalette, actress, film director, and screenwriter
 Joseph Facal, politician
 :fr: Claude Poissant, actor
 Claude Poissant, economist and journalist
 Jacques-Yvan Morin, lawyer and politician
 Charles Binamé, filmmaker
 :fr: Nicolas Duvernois, entrepreneur, Pur Vodka
 Rami Atallah, CEO & Founder of SSENSE

See also
Higher education in Quebec
List of colleges in Quebec

References

External links

 Collège Stanislas official website in the French language with an English presentation document.
 Article involving Raoul Dandurand and the founding of Collège Stanislas
Collège d'Alma Website in French

Private schools in Quebec
Educational institutions established in 1938
Private subsidized colleges in Quebec
French international schools in Canada
High schools in Quebec
High schools in Montreal
International schools in Quebec
Elementary schools in Montreal
Elementary schools in Quebec
Schools in Quebec City
Outremont, Quebec
1938 establishments in Quebec